Äntligen – Marie Fredrikssons bästa 1984–2000 (Finally – Marie Fredriksson's Best) is the first greatest hits compilation album by Swedish singer-songwriter Marie Fredriksson, released on 31 March 2000 by EMI. It was compiled by Fredriksson, and contains the majority of her singles, as well as several of her favourite album tracks. It was a commercial success upon release in her native country, spending eight weeks at number 1 on the Sverigetopplistan chart, and eventually being certified triple platinum by the Swedish Recording Industry Association for shipments of almost a quarter of a million units.

Background and recording
The album contains every single released by Fredriksson since her 1984 debut album, Het vind, with the exception of three: Het vinds title track, "Silver i din hand" from 1985's Den sjunde vågen, and the limited edition single "Ber bara en gång" from 1996's I en tid som vår. Also excluded is her collaboration with former ABBA vocalist Anni-Frid Lyngstad, "Alla mina bästa år", which was taken from Frida's album Djupa andetag (1996) and released as a single in 1997.

The record contains two previously unreleased recordings, both of which were released as singles. "Äntligen" was issued as the lead single, and became a top forty hit in Sweden. A remixed version of the song, re-titled "Solen gick ner över stan", was also included on the album. The remaining song, "Det som var nu" – a duet with singer-songwriter Patrik Isaksson – was released in Sweden as the second single, where it peaked at number 59. The latter is a Swedish re-recording of a track originally demoed in the late 1990s for Roxette's 1999 album Have a Nice Day. The original English demo of the track, titled "Always the Last to Know", subsequently leaked onto the internet in 2002 when a former member of EMI staff sold a bootleg CD at a Dutch record fair.

Commercial performance
The record was a major commercial success in Fredriksson's native country, debuting at number one and spending a total of eight non-consecutive weeks at the top spot. It went on to spend over a year on the album chart there. It was the second best-selling album of 2000 in the country, behind 1, a greatest hits compilation by The Beatles, and was also the 87th best-selling album of 2001. The album was eventually certified triple platinum by the Swedish Recording Industry Association for shipments of almost 250,000 units. It was also a success in neighbouring Norway, peaking at number six, and was certified gold by the International Federation of the Phonographic Industry for shipments of over 25,000 units in Norway.

The success of the album led Fredriksson to perform a series of 18 concerts throughout Sweden, her first solo concerts since 1992. Äntligen – Sommarturné, a two-disc box set containing a live album and a DVD of her 10 August 2000 performance at Stockholm's Maritime Museum, was released on 24 November.

Track listing

Credits and personnel
Credits adapted from the liner notes of Äntligen – Marie Fredrikssons bästa 1984–2000.

 Recorded at EMI Studios in Stockholm and Studio Vinden in Djursholm, Sweden between March 1984 and February 2000.
 All songs produced by Lars-Göran "Lasse" Lindbom, except tracks 1, 2, 15, 16 and 17 produced by Marie Fredriksson and Mikael Bolyos; track 11 produced by Fredriksson, Anders Herrlin and Per "Pelle" Andersson; tracks 12, 13 and 14 produced by Fredriksson and Herrlin.
 Mastered by Åsa Winzell at Polar Mastering in Stockholm.Musicians Marie Fredriksson – lead and background vocals, piano, keyboards, synthesizer, church organ, musical arrangements, mixing
 Per "Pelle" Andersson – drums, keyboards, synthesizer, programming
 Staffan Astner – electric guitars
 Mikael Bolyos – background vocals, keyboards, musical arrangements, programming, engineering, mixing
 Anders Herrlin – bass guitar, keyboards, programming, musical arrangements, engineering, mixing
 Richard "Ricky" Johansson – bass guitar, electric upright bass
 Leif Larson – piano, keyboards, synthesizer
 Lars-Göran "Lasse" Lindbom – acoustic guitar, engineering, mixingTechnical personnel Kjell Andersson – sleeve design
 Björn Boström – engineering 
 Lisa Derkert – hair and make-up
 Mattias Edwall – photography
 Roger Krieg – mixing 
 Lisa Lindqwister – stylist
 Alar Suurna – engineering and mixing
 Pär Wickholm – sleeve designAdditional musicians'

 Micke "Syd" Andersson – hi-hat 
 Ove Andersson – bass 
 "Backa" Hans Eriksson – bass 
 Marianne Flynner – backing vocals 
 Anders Garstedt – trumpet and flugelhorn 
 Karin Hammar – trombone 
 Jonas Isacsson – electric guitar 
 Patrik Isaksson – lead and background vocals, sangbe drum 
 Christer Jansson – drums and percussion 
 Mats Kiesel – musical arrangement and choir conductor 
 Jan "Nane" Kvillsäter – guitars 
 Magnus Lindgren – musical arrangements, tenor and baritone saxophones 
 Per Malmstedt – synthesizer 
 Nacka Musikklasser  – choir 
 Nacka Musikskolas  – choir 
 Tove Naess – backing vocals 
 Tommy Nilsson – backing vocals 
 Hans "Hasse" Olsson – piano and synthesizer 
 Mikael Rickfors – backing vocals 
 Ki Rydberg – backing vocals 
 Max Schultz – guitar 
 Torbjörn Stener – guitar 
 Mattias Torell – electric and acoustic guitars 
 Nicki Wallin – drums 
 Basse Wickman – backing vocals

Charts

Weekly charts

Year-end charts

Certifications

Release history

References 

Marie Fredriksson compilation albums
2000 greatest hits albums